The Hong Kong Café was a Los Angeles restaurant and music venue that was a part of the Los Angeles punk rock scene during the late 1970s and early 1980s when the club was owned and operated by Barry Seidel, Kim Turner and Suzie Frank,followed by a resurgence from 1992 to 1995.

Located at 425 Gin Ling Way in the Chinatown district of Downtown Los Angeles, California and across the way from sometimes rival Esther Wong's Madame Wong's, the former Chinese restaurant was open to audiences of all ages.

It can briefly be seen in the 1974 movie, Chinatown.

History

First Run of Shows: 1979-1981
The Plugz and UXA played at the club's opening night on June 7, 1979, and numerous bands, including X, Catholic Discipline, The Mau-Mau's, Bags, The Smart Pills, Nervous Gender, and The Alley Cats, performed there until its closing in January 1981.  Concert footage filmed at Hong Kong Café appears in the Penelope Spheeris documentary film The Decline of Western Civilization.

The Hong Kong Cafe was typically more open to punk and hardcore acts than Madame Wong's. Black Flag played some of its first few shows at the Hong Kong Cafe.

Resurgence: 1992-1995
The venue reopened for music in 1992, featuring shows from acts such as D.I., Guttermouth The Offspring, and the Voodoo Glow Skulls.

Aftermath
The space is currently occupied by Realm, a housewares and gifts retailer.

Shows at the Hong Kong Café
Shows from the Hong Kong's first months:

References

External links 

 Hong Kong Cafe 
 Realm
The Go-Go's Notebook: Hong Kong Cafe

Music venues in Los Angeles
Punk rock venues
Nightclubs in Los Angeles County, California
Chinatown, Los Angeles
Historic Rock and Roll Landmarks
Music venues completed in 1979
1979 establishments in California
1981 disestablishments in California